Pectinotrichum is a genus of fungi within the Onygenaceae family. This is a monotypic genus, containing the single species Pectinotrichum llanense.

References

External links
 Pectinotrichum at Index Fungorum

Onygenales
Monotypic Eurotiomycetes genera